WZUS 100.9 (FM) is a commercial radio station broadcasting a talk radio format. Licensed to Macon, Illinois, the station serves the Decatur Area, and is owned by The Cromwell Group, Inc. of Illinois.  WZUS has an effective radiated power (ERP) of 6,000 watts.

Programming
WZUS carries a local morning talk and farm news show, "Busboom & Wolfe."  The rest of the weekday schedule is made up of nationally syndicated talk shows, including Glenn Beck, Dave Ramsey, Dan Bongino, Dana Loesch, Mark Levin, Ben Shapiro, Joe Pags and Red Eye Radio.

History
Its original call sign was WKXK. Its original city of license was Pana, Illinois.

In 1989, the call letters changed to WXKO-FM and from 2000 to 2002, the call sign was WEGY.

References

External links
WZUS's official website

ZUS
News and talk radio stations in the United States